Abdyl bej Koka was an Albanian feudal, who played an important role in several Albanian revolts in the 19th century.

Life
Abdyl bej Koka was born in Delvinë. He was a member of a rich local family that owned large tracts of land. Unsatisfied with Ottoman rule of Albania, he joined local revolts in the early 19th century, and soon became one of the most important leaders of Albanian revolts against the Ottoman Empire. In 1828, Koka was among Albanian leaders who participated at a convention in Berat where a list of requests was compiled and sent to the Sublime Porte. Among the requests were the removal of non-Albanians from official posts in territories with Albanian population and replacement of them with Albanian officials. After the failure of the convention's goals, Koka continued his activities, collaborating with other leaders such as Tafil Buzi, Zenel Gjoleka, Mahmut Bajraktari, Ali bej Frakulla in revolts of 1833, 1834, 1835 and 1837.

See also
Albanian revolts of 1833–39

References

18th-century Albanian people 
19th-century Albanian people
People from Delvinë